Ed Philpott (born September 14, 1945 in Wichita, Kansas) is a former American football linebacker in the National Football League. He was drafted by the Boston Patriots in the fourth round of the 1967 NFL Draft. He played college football at Miami (OH).

Philpott is a member of the Patriots 10th Anniversary Team.

References

External links
New England Patriots bio

1945 births
Living people
American Football League players
American football linebackers
Boston Patriots players
Miami RedHawks football players
New England Patriots players
Players of American football from Wichita, Kansas
Southern California Sun players